The Florida Marlins' 2004 season was the 12th season for the Major League Baseball (MLB) franchise in the National League.  It would begin with the team attempting to improve on their season from 2003, where they were the defending World Series champion, having won the World Series in six games against the New York Yankees. Their manager was Jack McKeon. They played most of their home games at Pro Player Stadium. They played two against the Montreal Expos at Chicago's U.S. Cellular Field due to Hurricane Ivan. The team started off 8-1, but then collapsed and finished with a record of 83-79, 3rd in the NL East, and missed the playoffs.

Offseason
November 25, 2003: Derrek Lee was traded by the Florida Marlins to the Chicago Cubs for Hee-seop Choi and Mike Nannini (minors).
December 4, 2003: Matt Treanor was signed as a free agent with the Florida Marlins.

Regular season

Season standings

National League East

Record vs. opponents

Opening Day starters
 Juan Pierre – CF 
 Luis Castillo – 2B
 Miguel Cabrera – RF
 Mike Lowell – 3B
 Jeff Conine – LF
 Hee-Seop Choi – 1B
 Ramón Castro – C
 Álex González – SS
 Josh Beckett – SP

Transactions
May 6, 2004: Josías Manzanillo was signed as a free agent with the Florida Marlins.
June 17, 2004: Billy Koch was traded by the Chicago White Sox to the Florida Marlins for Wilson Valdez and cash.
July 30, 2004: Paul Lo Duca was traded by the Los Angeles Dodgers with Juan Encarnación and Guillermo Mota to the Florida Marlins for Hee-seop Choi, Brad Penny, and Bill Murphy.
September 8, 2004: Dave Weathers was signed as a free agent with the Florida Marlins.

Roster

Player stats

Batting

Starters by position
Note: Pos = Position; G = Games played; AB = At bats; R = Runs; H = Hits; Avg. = Batting average; HR = Home runs; RBI = Runs batted in; SB = Stolen bases

Other batters
Note: G = Games played; AB = At bats; R = Runs; H = Hits; HR = Home runs; RBI = Runs batted in; Avg. = Batting average; SB = Stolen bases

Pitching

Starting pitchers
Note: G = Games pitched; IP = Innings pitched; W = Wins; L = Losses; ERA = Earned run average; SO = Strikeouts

Other pitchers 
Note: G = Games pitched; IP = Innings pitched; W = Wins; L = Losses; ERA = Earned run average; SO = Strikeouts

Relief pitchers 
Note: G = Games pitched; W = Wins; L = Losses; SV = Saves; ERA = Earned run average; SO = Strikeouts

Farm system

References

External links
2004 Florida Marlins at Baseball Reference
2004 Florida Marlins at Baseball Almanac

Miami Marlins seasons
Miami
Florida Marlins